| tries = 
| highest attendance = 27,437Edinburgh v Glasgow (28 December 2019)
| lowest attendance = 1,500Southern Kings v Connacht (1 March 2020)
| top point scorer =  JJ Hanrahan (Munster)101 points
| top try scorer =  Rhyno Smith(Cheetahs)10 tries
| website = www.pro14rugby.org
| prevseason = 2018–19
| nextseason = 2020–21
}}

The 2019–20 PRO14 (also known as the Guinness PRO14 for sponsorship reasons) was the nineteenth season of the professional rugby union competition originally known as the Celtic League. It was the third season to be referred to as the PRO14 (the competition was named the Pro12 immediately prior to the addition of two South African teams).

Fourteen teams competed in this season — four Irish teams: Connacht, Leinster, Munster and Ulster; two Italian teams: Benetton and Zebre; two Scottish teams: Edinburgh and Glasgow Warriors; two South African teams: Cheetahs and the Southern Kings; and four Welsh teams: Cardiff Blues, Dragons, Ospreys and Scarlets.

On 12 March 2020, the season was suspended due to the COVID-19 pandemic. It restarted on 22 August in a truncated format. 

It was won by Leinster, their third consecutive Pro14 title, and the third occasion on which they had achieved a Perfect season by winning every match - a feat achieved by no other team in the competition's history.

Teams

Competition format

 League Stage

The fourteen teams are split into two conferences of seven teams, with each conference featuring two teams from Ireland and Wales plus one team from Italy, Scotland and South Africa. To ensure a competitive balance, the teams are distributed approximately evenly between the conferences based upon their performance in the previous season.

The regular season was due to be made up of 21 rounds. The original schedule was planned as follows –
6 home and 6 away games against each team in their own conference
7 games, either home or away, against the teams in the other conference
2 additional regional derbies
Each Irish team plays the two Irish teams in the other conference, one at home and one away
Each Welsh team plays the two Welsh teams in the other conference, one at home and one away
The two Italian teams play each other twice, home and away
The two Scottish teams play each other twice, home and away
The two South African teams play each other twice, home and away

Impact of COVID-19 Pandemic 
All teams played their normal schedule until round 13 after which an additional two rounds of derby matches were played by the 12 European teams. The Southern Kings announced in August 2020 that they had voluntarily withdrawn from the league for the remainder of 2020 and therefore there will not be South African derbies.

League Play-Offs

The first and second placed teams in each conferences will meet in the semi-finals. The winners of the semi-finals will then meet in the grand final.

Champions Cup Qualification

The top four eligible European teams in both conferences automatically qualify for the 2020–21 European Rugby Champions Cup. (The South African teams do not compete in the Champions Cup.) Qualification is based on league position after round 13.

Team changes

Ireland
Connacht underwent a rebranding during the off-season, updating their team crest in the process. During the course of the season, the planned redevelopment of the Sportsground was boosted by the commitment of €20 million from the Irish government.

Leinster's highest profile departure in the off-season was Seán O'Brien, who made over 100 appearances and was the side's former vice-captain. With captain Johnny Sexton and vice-captain Rhys Ruddock missing the start of the season due to the World Cup, Scott Fardy served as team captain in the opening rounds.

Munster's backs coach Felix Jones and forwards coach Jerry Flannery left the province when their contracts expired in June 2019. Former attack coach for the Australian national team, Stephen Larkham, was signed by the province as a senior coach ahead of the season, while Graham Rowntree joined as their new forwards coach after the completion of his duties with Georgia at the World Cup. The team's regular captain, Peter O'Mahony, missed the opening rounds of the tournament due to the World Cup, during which time Billy Holland captained the side.

Long-serving Ulster captain Rory Best announced in April 2019 that he would retire from rugby after the 2019 Rugby World Cup. Iain Henderson replaced Best as captain. With Henderson unavailable in the opening rounds due to the World Cup, the side was captained by Rob Herring. Herring was later called up to the World Cup as an injury replacement, and the captaincy went to Billy Burns.

Italy

Scotland

South Africa

Cheetahs announced in June 2019 that Hawies Fourie had replaced Franco Smith as their head coach.

Wales

Then-Crusaders assistant coach Brad Mooar was confirmed as Wayne Pivac's replacement as Scarlets head coach in December 2018, with Pivac leaving the region to take over from Warren Gatland as Wales' head coach after the 2019 Rugby World Cup. Scarlets also appointed then-Highlanders defence coach and former London Irish head coach Glenn Delaney as their new defence coach, replacing the outgoing Byron Hayward.

Dragons announced the departure of head coach Bernard Jackman in December 2018, with Ceri Jones replacing Jackman on an interim basis for the remainder of the 2018–19 season, before the region confirmed in May 2019 that Dean Ryan would join in the newly created director of rugby position.

Table

Match summary

Conference Rounds 1 to 13
All times are local.

Round 1

Round 2

Round 3

Round 4

Round 5

Round 6

Round 7

Round 8

1872 Cup 1st round

Round 9

1872 Cup 2nd round

Round 10

Round 8 (South Africa)

Round 9 (South Africa)

Round 11

Postponed due to bad weather. Game to be rescheduled for 6 March 2020.

Round 12

Round 13

Postponed due to coronavirus fears. Awarded as a 0–0 draw

Postponed due to coronavirus fears. Awarded as a 0–0 draw

Round 11 (rescheduled game)

Rescheduled from 15 February 2020.

Additional Derby Rounds

Round 14

1872 Cup 3rd round

Round 15

Judgement Day

Play-offs

In a change to the normal format, the top two sides from each of the two conferences met in the two semi-finals to determine the finalists. The quarter-finals featuring the second and third teams in each conference were scrapped for the 2019–20 season.

Semi-finals

Final

Referees

Attendances by club
 Includes quarter-finals and semi-finals – the final is not included as it is held at a neutral venue. Due to the Conference A & B structure of 21 rounds in the Pro14, some teams played 10 league home games during the league stage, while others played 11. Does not include European Champions Cup play-off game.

Highest attendances

End of Season Awards

PRO14 Dream Team

The 2019–20 Pro14 Dream Team is:

Award winners
The 2019–20 Pro14 season award winners are:

Leading scorers
Note: Flags to the left of player names indicate national team as has been defined under World Rugby eligibility rules, or primary nationality for players who have not yet earned international senior caps. Players may hold one or more non-WR nationalities.

Most points

Most tries

Notes

References

External links
 Official website

 
2019–20 in European rugby union leagues
2019-20
2019–20 in Irish rugby union
2019–20 in Italian rugby union
2019–20 in Scottish rugby union
2019–20 in Welsh rugby union
2019 in South African rugby union
2020 in South African rugby union